Argentina at the 1924 Summer Olympics in Paris, France was the nation's fourth appearance out of seven editions of the Summer Olympic Games. Argentina sent to the 1924 Summer Olympics its first national team, under the auspices of the Argentine Olympic Committee (Comité Olímpico Argentino), 77 athletes (all males) that competed in 39 events in 11 sports. They brought home Argentina's inaugural batch of Olympic medals, one gold in a team sport, three silver and two bronze; the latter five medals for individual achievement.

Medalists

Aquatics

Swimming

Ranks given are within the heat.

Athletics

Ten athletes represented Argentina in 1924. It was the nation's debut appearance in the sport. Brunetto took a silver medal in the triple jump, and briefly held the Olympic record in the event.

Ranks given are within the heat.

Boxing 

Ten boxers represented Argentina at the 1924 Games. It was the nation's second appearance in boxing. Argentina won its first medals in the sport, taking four medals total but no championships.

Cycling

Five cyclists represented Argentina in 1924. It was the nation's debut in the sport.

Road cycling
Ranks given are within the heat.

Track cycling
Ranks given are within the heat.

Fencing

Thirteen fencers, all men, represented Argentina in 1924. It was the nation's second appearance in the sport, and first since 1900. Larraz matched the country's best individual fencing result to date, set in 1900, at fifth place.

 Men

Ranks given are within the pool.

Polo

Argentina sent a polo team to the Olympics for the first time in 1924. In the round-robin tournament, defeated Spain handily in its first game. The second game for Argentina was against the United States, who had already won their other three games and could clinch the gold by beating Argentina. The South Americans were able to come from behind late in the match, however, and defeat the United States. They then beat Great Britain and France to secure the championship.

Ranks given are within the pool.

Rowing

Nine rowers represented Argentina in 1924. It was the nation's debut in the sport.

Ranks given are within the heat.

Sailing

Five sailors represented Argentina in 1924. It was the nation's debut in the sport.

Shooting

Eight sport shooters represented Argentina in 1924. It was the nation's debut in the sport.

Tennis

 Men

Weightlifting

References

External links
 Official Olympic Reports
 International Olympic Committee results database
 
 

Nations at the 1924 Summer Olympics
1924
Olympics